The 2018–19 Cal Poly Mustangs men's basketball team represented California Polytechnic State University in the 2018–19 NCAA Division I men's basketball season. The Mustangs were led by tenth-year head coach Joe Callero and played their home games at the Mott Athletics Center. Cal Poly was a member of the Big West Conference, and participated in their 23rd consecutive season in that league. They finished the season 6–23 overall, 2–14 in Big West play to finish in ninth place. They failed to qualify for the Big West Conference tournament. On March 6, 2019, it was announced that head coach Joe Callero would not be retained after his 10th season. He compiled a record of 126–184 while at Cal Poly.

Previous season

The Mustangs finished 9–22, and 4–12 in the conference. During the season, the Mustangs participated in the Great Alaska Shootout, which was held in Santa Clara, California and Anchorage, Alaska. The Mustangs finished in 3rd place by defeating the College of Charleston but losing to Central Michigan and Idaho. Prior to the tournament, Cal Poly won at Santa Clara as a friendly match. In the postseason, Cal Poly lost to rival UC Santa Barbara in the quarterfinals of the 2018 Big West Conference men's basketball tournament in Anaheim, California.

Roster

Schedule

|-
!colspan=12 style=""| Non–conference regular season

|-
!colspan=12 style=""| Big West regular season

References

Cal Poly
Cal Poly Mustangs men's basketball seasons
Cal Poly
Cal Poly